

Events

Pre–1600
46 BC – Julius Caesar defeats Caecilius Metellus Scipio and Marcus Porcius Cato (Cato the Younger) at the Battle of Thapsus.
 402 – Stilicho defeats the Visigoths under Alaric in the Battle of Pollentia.
1320 – The Scots reaffirm their independence by signing the Declaration of Arbroath.
1453 – Mehmed II begins his siege of Constantinople. The city falls on May 29, and is renamed Istanbul.
1580 – One of the largest earthquakes recorded in the history of England, Flanders, or Northern France, takes place.

1601–1900
1652 – At the Cape of Good Hope, Dutch sailor Jan van Riebeeck establishes a resupply camp that eventually becomes Cape Town.
1712 – The New York Slave Revolt of 1712 begins near Broadway.
1776 – American Revolutionary War: Ships of the Continental Navy fail in their attempt to capture a Royal Navy dispatch boat.
1782 – King Buddha Yodfa Chulaloke (Rama I) of Siam (modern day Thailand) establishes the Chakri dynasty.
1793 – During the French Revolution, the Committee of Public Safety becomes the executive organ of the republic.
1800 – The Treaty of Constantinople establishes the Septinsular Republic, the first autonomous Greek state since the Fall of the Byzantine Empire. (Under the Old Style calendar then still in use in the Ottoman Empire, the treaty was signed on 21 March.)
1808 – John Jacob Astor incorporates the American Fur Company, that would eventually make him America's first millionaire.
1812 – British forces under the command of the Duke of Wellington assault the fortress of Badajoz. This would be the turning point in the Peninsular War against Napoleon-led France.
1814 – Nominal beginning of the Bourbon Restoration; anniversary date that Napoleon abdicates and is exiled to Elba.
1830 – Church of Christ, the original church of the Latter Day Saint movement, is organized by Joseph Smith and others at either Fayette or Manchester, New York.
1841 – U.S. President John Tyler is sworn in, two days after having become president upon William Henry Harrison's death.
1860 – The Reorganized Church of Jesus Christ of Latter Day Saints, later renamed Community of Christ, is organized by Joseph Smith III and others at Amboy, Illinois.
1862 – American Civil War: The Battle of Shiloh begins: In Tennessee, forces under Union General Ulysses S. Grant meet Confederate troops led by General Albert Sidney Johnston.
1865 – American Civil War: The Battle of Sailor's Creek: Confederate General Robert E. Lee's Army of Northern Virginia fights and loses its last major battle while in retreat from Richmond, Virginia, during the Appomattox Campaign.
1866 – The Grand Army of the Republic, an American patriotic organization composed of Union veterans of the American Civil War, is founded. It lasts until 1956.
1896 – In Athens, the opening of the first modern Olympic Games is celebrated, 1,500 years after the original games are banned by Roman emperor Theodosius I.

1901–present
1909 – Robert Peary and Matthew Henson become the first people to reach the North Pole; Peary's claim has been disputed because of failings in his navigational ability.
1911 – During the Battle of Deçiq, Dedë Gjon Luli Dedvukaj, leader of the Malësori Albanians, raises the Albanian flag in the town of Tuzi, Montenegro, for the first time after George Kastrioti (Skanderbeg).
1917 – World War I: The United States declares war on Germany.
1918 – Finnish Civil War: The battle of Tampere ends.
1926 – Varney Airlines makes its first commercial flight (Varney is the root company of United Airlines).
1929 – Huey P. Long, Governor of Louisiana, is impeached by the Louisiana House of Representatives.
1930 – At the end of the Salt March, Gandhi raises a lump of mud and salt and declares, "With this, I am shaking the foundations of the British Empire."
1936 – Tupelo–Gainesville tornado outbreak: Another tornado from the same storm system as the Tupelo tornado hits Gainesville, Georgia, killing 203.
1941 – World War II: Nazi Germany launches Operation 25 (the invasion of Kingdom of Yugoslavia) and Operation Marita (the invasion of Greece).
1945 – World War II: Sarajevo is liberated from German and Croatian forces by the Yugoslav Partisans.
  1945   – World War II: The Battle of Slater's Knoll on Bougainville comes to an end.
1947 – The first Tony Awards are presented for theatrical achievement.
1957 – The flag carrier airline of Greece for decades, Olympic Airways, is founded by Aristotle Onassis following the acquisition of "TAE - Greek National Airlines".
1958 – Capital Airlines Flight 67 crashes into Saginaw Bay near Freeland, Michigan, killing 47.
1965 – Launch of Early Bird, the first commercial communications satellite to be placed in geosynchronous orbit.
1968 – In the downtown district of Richmond, Indiana, a double explosion kills 41 and injures 150.
  1968   – Pierre Elliott Trudeau wins the Liberal Party leadership election, and becomes Prime Minister of Canada soon afterward.
1970 – Newhall massacre: Four California Highway Patrol officers are killed in a shootout.
1972 – Vietnam War: Easter Offensive: American forces begin sustained air strikes and naval bombardments.
1973 – Launch of Pioneer 11 spacecraft.
  1973   – The American League of Major League Baseball begins using the designated hitter.
1984 – Members of Cameroon's Republican Guard unsuccessfully attempt to overthrow the government headed by Paul Biya.
1985 – Sudanese President Gaafar Nimeiry is ousted from power in a coup d'état led by Field Marshal Abdel Rahman Swar al-Dahab.
1992 – The Bosnian War begins.
1994 – The Rwandan genocide begins when the aircraft carrying Rwandan president Juvénal Habyarimana and Burundian president Cyprien Ntaryamira is shot down.
1997 – In Greene County, Tennessee, the Lillelid murders occur.
1998 – Nuclear weapons testing: Pakistan tests medium-range missiles capable of reaching India.
2004 – Rolandas Paksas becomes the first president of Lithuania to be peacefully removed from office by impeachment.
2005 – Kurdish leader Jalal Talabani becomes Iraqi president; Shiite Arab Ibrahim al-Jaafari is named premier the next day.
2008 – The 2008 Egyptian general strike starts led by Egyptian workers later to be adopted by April 6 Youth Movement and Egyptian activists.
2009 – A 6.3 magnitude earthquake strikes near L'Aquila, Italy, killing 307.
2010 – Maoist rebels kill 76 CRPF officers in Dantewada district, India.
2011 – In San Fernando, Tamaulipas, Mexico, over 193 victims of Los Zetas were exhumed from several mass graves.
2012 – Azawad declares itself independent from the Republic of Mali.
2017 – U.S. military launches 59 Tomahawk cruise missiles at an air base in Syria. Russia describes the strikes as an "aggression", adding they significantly damage US-Russia ties.
2018 – A bus carrying the Humboldt Broncos junior ice hockey team collides with a semi-truck in Saskatchewan, Canada, killing 16 people and injuring 13 others.

Births

Pre–1600
1135 – Maimonides, Jewish philosopher, Torah scholar, physician and astronomer (March 30 also proposed, d. 1204)
1342 – Infanta Maria, Marchioness of Tortosa
1573 – Margaret of Brunswick-Lüneburg, German noble (d. 1643)

1601–1900
1632 – Maria Leopoldine of Austria (d. 1649)
1651 – André Dacier, French scholar and academic (d. 1722)
1660 – Johann Kuhnau, German organist and composer (d. 1722)
1664 – Arvid Horn, Swedish general and politician, Governor of Västerbotten County (d. 1742)
1671 – Jean-Baptiste Rousseau, French poet and playwright (d. 1741)
1672 – André Cardinal Destouches, French composer (d. 1749)
1706 – Louis de Cahusac, French playwright and composer (d. 1759)
1708 – Johann Georg Reutter, Austrian organist and composer (d. 1772)
1725 – Pasquale Paoli, French soldier and politician (d. 1807)
1726 – Gerard Majella, Italian saint (d. 1755)
1741 – Nicolas Chamfort, French author and playwright (d. 1794)
1766 – Wilhelm von Kobell, German painter and educator (d. 1853)
1773 – James Mill, Scottish historian, economist, and philosopher (d. 1836)
1787 – Celestina Cordero, Puerto Rican educator (d. 1862)
1810 – Philip Henry Gosse, English biologist and academic (d. 1888)
1812 – Alexander Herzen, Russian philosopher and author (d. 1870)
1815 – Robert Volkmann, German organist, composer, and conductor (d. 1883)
1818 – Aasmund Olavsson Vinje, Norwegian journalist and poet (d. 1870)
1820 – Nadar, French photographer, journalist, and author (d. 1910)
1823 – Joseph Medill, Canadian-American publisher and politician, 26th Mayor of Chicago (d. 1899)
1824 – George Waterhouse, English-New Zealand politician, 7th Prime Minister of New Zealand (d. 1906)
1826 – Gustave Moreau, French painter and academic (d. 1898)
1844 – William Lyne, Australian politician, 13th Premier of New South Wales (d. 1913)
1851 – Guillaume Bigourdan, French astronomer and academic (d. 1932)
1852 – Will Crooks, English trade unionist and politician (d. 1921)
1855 – Charles Huot, Canadian painter and illustrator (d. 1930)
1857 – Arthur Wesley Dow, American painter and photographer (d. 1922)
1860 – René Lalique, French sculptor and jewellery designer (d. 1945)
1861 – Stanislas de Guaita, French poet and author (d. 1897)
1864 – William Bate Hardy, English biologist and academic (d. 1934)
1866 – Felix-Raymond-Marie Rouleau, Canadian cardinal (d. 1931)
1869 – Levon Shant, Armenian author, poet, and playwright (d. 1951)
1878 – Erich Mühsam, German author, poet, and playwright (d. 1934)
1881 – Karl Staaf, Swedish pole vaulter and hammer thrower (d. 1953)
1884 – J. G. Parry-Thomas, Welsh race car driver and engineer (d. 1927)
1886 – Athenagoras I of Constantinople (d. 1972)
  1886   – Walter Dandy, American physician and neurosurgeon (d. 1946)
  1886   – Osman Ali Khan, Asaf Jah VII, Indian ruler (d. 1967)
1888 – Hans Richter, Swiss painter, illustrator, and director (d. 1976)
  1888   – Gerhard Ritter, German historian and academic (d. 1967)
1890 – Anthony Fokker, Dutch engineer and businessman, founded Fokker Aircraft Manufacturer (d. 1939)
1892 – Donald Wills Douglas, Sr., American businessman, founded the Douglas Aircraft Company (d. 1981)
  1892   – Lowell Thomas, American journalist and author (d. 1981)
1895 – Dudley Nichols, American director, producer, and screenwriter (d. 1960)
1898 – Jeanne Hébuterne, French painter and author (d. 1920) 
1900 – Leo Robin, American composer and songwriter (d. 1984)

1901–present
1901 – Pier Giorgio Frassati, Italian activist (d. 1925)
1902 – Julien Torma, French author, poet, and playwright (d. 1933)
1903 – Mickey Cochrane, American baseball player and manager (d. 1962)
  1903   – Harold Eugene Edgerton, American engineer and academic (d. 1990)
1904 – Kurt Georg Kiesinger, German lawyer, politician and Chancellor of Germany (d. 1988)
  1904   – Erwin Komenda, Austrian car designer and engineer (d. 1966)
1908 – Marcel-Marie Desmarais, Canadian preacher, missionary, and author (d. 1994)
1909 – William M. Branham, American minister and theologian (d. 1965)
  1909   – Hermann Lang, German race car driver (d. 1987)
1910 – Barys Kit, Belarusian-American rocket scientist (d. 2018)
1911 – Feodor Felix Konrad Lynen, German biochemist and academic, Nobel Prize laureate (d. 1979)
1913 – Shannon Boyd-Bailey McCune, American geographer and academic (d. 1993)
1915 – Tadeusz Kantor, Polish director, painter, and set designer (d. 1990)
1916 – Phil Leeds, American actor (d. 1998)
  1916   – Vincent Ellis McKelvey, American geologist and author (d. 1987)
1917 – Leonora Carrington, English-Mexican painter and author (d. 2011)
1918 – Alfredo Ovando Candía, Bolivian general and politician, 56th President of Bolivia (d. 1982)
1919 – Georgios Mylonas, Greek politician, 11th Greek Minister of Culture (d. 1998)
1920 – Jack Cover, American pilot and physicist, invented the Taser gun (d. 2009)
  1920   – Edmond H. Fischer, Swiss-American biochemist and academic, Nobel Prize laureate (d. 2021)
1921 – Wilbur Thompson, American shot putter (d. 2013)
1922 – Gordon Chater, English-Australian comedian and actor (d. 1999)
1923 – Herb Thomas, American race car driver (d. 2000)
1926 – Sergio Franchi, Italian-American singer and actor (d. 1990)
  1926   – Gil Kane, Latvian-American author and illustrator (d. 2000)
  1926   – Ian Paisley, Northern Irish evangelical minister and politician, 2nd First Minister of Northern Ireland (d. 2014)
  1926   – Randy Weston, American jazz pianist and composer (d. 2018)
1927 – Gerry Mulligan, American saxophonist, clarinet player, and composer (d. 1996)
  1928   – James Watson, American biologist, geneticist, and zoologist, Nobel Prize laureate
1929 – Willis Hall, English playwright and author (d. 2005)
  1929   – Joi Lansing, American model, actress and nightclub singer (d. 1972)
  1929   – André Previn, American pianist, composer, and conductor (d. 2019)
  1929   – Christos Sartzetakis, Greek jurist, supreme justice and President of Greece (d. 2022) 
1931 – Ram Dass, American author and educator (d. 2019)
  1931   – Ivan Dixon, American actor, director, and producer (d. 2008)
1932 – Connie Broden, Canadian ice hockey player (d. 2013)
  1932   – Helmut Griem, German actor and director (d. 2004)
1933 – Roy Goode, English lawyer and academic
  1933   – Tom C. Korologos, American journalist and diplomat, United States Ambassador to Belgium
  1933   – Eduardo Malapit, American lawyer and politician, Mayor of Kauai (d. 2007)
1934 – Enrique Álvarez Félix, Mexican actor (d. 1996)
  1934   – Anton Geesink, Dutch martial artist and wrestler (d. 2010)
  1934   – Guy Peellaert, Belgian painter, illustrator, and photographer (d. 2008)
1935 – Douglas Hill, Canadian author and critic (d. 2007)
1936 – Helen Berman, Dutch-Israeli painter and illustrator
  1936   – Jean-Pierre Changeux, French neuroscientist, biologist, and academic
1937 – Merle Haggard, American singer-songwriter and guitarist (d. 2016)
  1937   – Tom Veivers, Australian cricketer and politician
  1937   – Billy Dee Williams, American actor, singer, and writer
1938 – Paul Daniels, English magician and television host (d. 2016)
1938 – Roy Thinnes, American television and film actor
1939 – André Ouellet, Canadian lawyer and politician, 1st Canadian Minister of Foreign Affairs
  1939   – John Sculley, American businessman, co-founded Zeta Interactive
1940 – Homero Aridjis, Mexican journalist, author, and poet
  1940   – Pedro Armendáriz, Jr., Mexican-American actor and producer (d. 2011)
1941 – Christopher Allsopp, English economist and academic
  1941   – Phil Austin, American comedian, actor, and screenwriter (d. 2015)
  1941   – Hans W. Geißendörfer, German director and producer
  1941   – Angeliki Laiou, Greek-American Byzantinist and politician (d. 2008) 
  1941   – Don Prudhomme, American race car driver and manager
  1941   – Gheorghe Zamfir, Romanian flute player and composer
1942 – Barry Levinson, American actor, director, producer, and screenwriter
  1942   – Anita Pallenberg, Italian-English model, actress, and fashion designer (d. 2017)
1943 – Max Clifford, English journalist and publicist (d. 2017)
  1943   – Roger Cook, New Zealand-English journalist and academic 
  1943   – Ian MacRae, New Zealand rugby player
  1943   – Mitchell Melton, American lawyer and politician (d. 2013)
1944 – Felicity Palmer, English operatic soprano
1945 – Rodney Bickerstaffe, English trade union leader (d. 2017)
  1945   – Peter Hill, English journalist
1946 – Paul Beresford, New Zealand-English dentist and politician
1947 – John Ratzenberger, American actor and director
  1947   – André Weinfeld, French-American director, producer, and screenwriter
  1947   – Mike Worboys, English mathematician and computer scientist
1949 – Alyson Bailes, English academic and diplomat (d. 2016)
  1949   – Patrick Hernandez, French singer-songwriter
  1949   – Ng Ser Miang, Singaporean athlete, entrepreneur and diplomat
  1949   – Horst Ludwig Störmer, German physicist and academic, Nobel Prize laureate
1950 – Claire Morissette, Canadian cycling activist (d. 2007)
  1950   – Cleo Odzer, American anthropologist and author (d. 2001)
1951 – Bert Blyleven, Dutch-American baseball player and sportscaster
  1951   – Jean-Marc Boivin, French skier, mountaineer, and pilot (d. 1990)
  1951   – Pascal Rogé, French pianist
1952 – Udo Dirkschneider, German singer-songwriter 
  1952   – Marilu Henner, Greek-Polish American actress and author
  1952   – Michel Larocque, Canadian ice hockey player and manager (d. 1992)
1953 – Patrick Doyle, Scottish actor and composer
  1953   – Christopher Franke, German-American drummer and songwriter 
1955 – Rob Epstein, American director and producer
  1955   – Michael Rooker, American actor, director, and producer
  1955   – Cathy Jones, Canadian actress, comedian, and writer
1956 – Michele Bachmann, American lawyer and politician
  1956   – Normand Corbeil, Canadian composer (d. 2013)
  1956   – Mudassar Nazar, Pakistani cricketer
  1956   – Lee Scott, English politician
  1956   – Sebastian Spreng, Argentinian-American painter and journalist
  1956   – Dilip Vengsarkar, Indian cricketer and coach
1957 – Giorgio Damilano, Italian race walker and coach
  1957   – Maurizio Damilano, Italian race walker and coach
  1957   – Jaroslava Maxová, Czech soprano and educator
  1957   – Paolo Nespoli, Italian soldier, engineer, and astronaut
1958 – Graeme Base, Australian author and illustrator
1959 – Gail Shea, Canadian politician
1960 – Warren Haynes, American singer-songwriter and guitarist
  1960   – Richard Loe, New Zealand rugby player 
  1960   – John Pizzarelli, American singer-songwriter and guitarist
1961 – Rory Bremner, Scottish impressionist and comedian
  1961   – Peter Jackson, English footballer and manager
1962 – Iris Häussler, German sculptor and academic
  1962   – Marco Schällibaum, Swiss footballer, coach, and manager
1963 – Rafael Correa, Ecuadorian economist and politician, 54th President of Ecuador
1964 – David Woodard, American conductor and writer
1965 – Black Francis, American singer-songwriter and guitarist 
  1965   – Sterling Sharpe, American football player and sportscaster
1966 – Vince Flynn, American author (d. 2013)
  1966   – Young Man Kang, South Korean-American director and producer
1967 – Julian Anderson, English composer and educator
  1967   – Kathleen Barr, Canadian voice actress and singer
  1967   – Tanya Byron, English psychologist and academic
  1967   – Jonathan Firth, English actor
1968 – Archon Fung, American political scientist, author, and academic
  1968   – Affonso Giaffone, Brazilian race car driver
1969 – Bret Boone, American baseball player and manager
  1969   – Bison Dele, American basketball player (d. 2002)
  1969   – Philipp Peter, Austrian race car driver
  1969   – Paul Rudd, American actor
  1969   – Spencer Wells, American geneticist and anthropologist
1970 – Olaf Kölzig, South African-German ice hockey player and coach
  1970   – Roy Mayorga, American drummer, songwriter, and producer 
  1970   – Huang Xiaomin, Chinese swimmer
1972 – Anders Thomas Jensen, Danish director and screenwriter
  1972   – Dickey Simpkins, American basketball player and sportscaster
1973 – Donnie Edwards, American football player
  1973   – Randall Godfrey, American football player
  1973   – Rie Miyazawa, Japanese model and actress
  1973   – Sun Wen, Chinese footballer
1975 – Zach Braff, American actor, director, producer, and screenwriter
  1975   – Hal Gill, American ice hockey player
1976 – Candace Cameron Bure, American actress and talk show panelist
  1976   – James Fox, Welsh singer-songwriter, guitarist, and actor
  1976   – Chris Hoke, American football player
  1976   – Georg Hólm, Icelandic bass player 
  1976   – Hirotada Ototake, Japanese author and educator
1977 – Ville Nieminen, Finnish ice hockey player
  1977   – Andy Phillips, American baseball player and coach
1978 – Imani Coppola, American singer-songwriter and violinist 
  1978   – Robert Glasper, American singer-songwriter, pianist, and producer
  1978   – Tim Hasselbeck, American football player and sportscaster
  1978   – Myleene Klass, Austrian/Filipino-English singer, pianist, and model 
  1978   – Martín Méndez, Uruguayan bass player and songwriter 
  1978   – Blaine Neal, American baseball player
  1978   – Igor Semshov, Russian footballer
1979 – Lord Frederick Windsor, English journalist and financier
  1979   – Clay Travis, American sports journalist, blogger, and broadcaster
1980 – Tommi Evilä, Finnish long jumper
  1980   – Tanja Poutiainen, Finnish skier 
  1980   – Antonio Thomas, American wrestler
1981 – Robert Earnshaw, Welsh footballer
  1981   – Jeff Faine, American football player
  1981   – Lucas Licht, Argentine footballer
  1981   – Alex Suarez, American bass player 
1982 – Travis Moen, Canadian ice hockey player
  1982   – Miguel Ángel Silvestre, Spanish actor
1983 – Mehdi Ballouchy, Moroccan footballer
  1983   – Jerome Kaino, New Zealand rugby player
  1983   – Mitsuru Nagata, Japanese footballer
  1983   – Remi Nicole, English singer-songwriter and actress
  1983   – James Wade, English darts player
  1983   – Katie Weatherston, Canadian ice hockey player
1984 – Max Bemis, American singer-songwriter 
  1984   – Michaël Ciani, French footballer
  1984   – Siboniso Gaxa, South African footballer
  1984   – Diana Matheson, Canadian soccer player
1985 – Clarke MacArthur, Canadian ice hockey player
  1985   – Frank Ongfiang, Cameroonian footballer
  1985   – Sinqua Walls, American basketball player and actor
1986 – Nikolas Asprogenis, Cypriot footballer
  1986   – Aaron Curry, American football player
  1986   – Goeido Gotaro, Japanese sumo wrestler
  1986   – Ryota Moriwaki, Japanese footballer
1987 – Benjamin Corgnet, French footballer
  1987   – Heidi Mount, American model
  1987   – Juan Adriel Ochoa, Mexican footballer
  1987   – Levi Porter, English footballer
  1987   – Hilary Rhoda, American model
1988 – Jucilei, Brazilian footballer
  1988   – Leigh Adams, Australian footballer
  1988   – Daniele Gasparetto, Italian footballer
  1988   – Carlton Mitchell, American football player
  1988   – Fabrice Muamba, Congolese-English footballer
  1988   – Ivonne Orsini, Puerto Rican model and television host, Miss World Puerto Rico 2008
1990 – Lachlan Coote, Australian rugby league player
  1990   – Charlie McDermott, American actor
  1990   – Andrei Veis, Estonian footballer
1992 – Ken, South Korean singer
  1992   – Julie Ertz, American soccer player
1994 – Adrián Alonso, Mexican actor
1995 – Darya Lebesheva, Belarusian tennis player
1998 – Peyton List, American actress and model
  1998   – Spencer List, American actor
2000 – Shaheen Afridi, Pakistani cricketer 
2002 – Leyre Romero Gormaz, Spanish tennis player
2009   – Shaylee Mansfield, deaf American actress and YouTuber
2009 – Valentina Tronel, French child singer, winner of the Junior Eurovision Song Contest 2020

Deaths

Pre–1600
 861 – Prudentius, bishop of Troyes 
 885 – Saint Methodius, Byzantine missionary and saint (b. 815)
 887 – Pei Che, chancellor of the Tang Dynasty
 943 – Liu Churang, Chinese general and chief of staff (b. 881)
   943   – Nasr II, ruler (amir) of the Samanid Empire (b. 906)
1147 – Frederick II, duke of Swabia (b. 1090)
1199 – Richard I, king of England (b. 1157)
1231 – William Marshal, 2nd Earl of Pembroke
1250 – Guillaume de Sonnac, Grand Master of the Knights Templar
1252 – Peter of Verona, Italian priest and saint (b. 1206)
1340 – Basil, emperor of Trebizond (Turkey)
1362 – James I, count of La Marche (b. 1319)
1376 – Preczlaw of Pogarell, Cardinal and Bishop of Wrocław (b. 1310)
1490 – Matthias Corvinus, King of Hungary and Croatia from 1458 to 1490 (b. 1443)
1520 – Raphael, Italian painter and architect (b. 1483)
1523 – Henry Stafford, 1st Earl of Wiltshire, English nobleman (b. 1479)
1528 – Albrecht Dürer, German painter, engraver, and mathematician (b. 1471)
1551 – Joachim Vadian, Swiss scholar and politician (b. 1484)
1571 – John Hamilton, Scottish archbishop and academic (b. 1512)
1590 – Francis Walsingham, English politician and diplomat, Chancellor of the Duchy of Lancaster (b. 1532)
1593 – Henry Barrowe, English Puritan and separatist (b. 1550)

1601–1900
1605 – John Stow, English historian and author (b. 1525)
1621 – Edward Seymour, 1st Earl of Hertford (b. 1539)
1641 – Domenico Zampieri (Domenichino), Italian painter (b. 1581)
1655 – David Blondel, French minister, historian, and scholar (b. 1591)
1670 – Leonora Baroni, Italian composer (b. 1611)
1676 – John Winthrop the Younger, English politician, 1st Governor of Connecticut (b. 1606)
1686 – Arthur Annesley, 1st Earl of Anglesey, Irish-English politician (b. 1614)
1707 – Willem van de Velde the Younger, Dutch-English painter (b. 1633)
1755 – Richard Rawlinson, English minister and historian (b. 1690)
1790 – Louis IX, Landgrave of Hesse-Darmstadt (b. 1719)
1825 – Vladimir Borovikovsky, Ukrainian-Russian painter and educator (b. 1757)
1827 – Nikolis Apostolis, Greek naval commander during the Greek War of Independence (b. 1770) 
1829 – Niels Henrik Abel, Norwegian mathematician and theorist (b. 1802)
1833 – Adamantios Korais, Greek philosopher and scholar (b. 1748)
1838 – José Bonifácio de Andrada, Brazilian poet, academic, and politician (b. 1763)
1860 – James Kirke Paulding, American author and politician, 11th United States Secretary of the Navy (b. 1778)
1862 – Albert Sidney Johnston, American general (b. 1803)
1883 – Benjamin Wright Raymond, American merchant and politician, 3rd Mayor of Chicago (b. 1801)
1886 – William Edward Forster, English businessman, philanthropist, and politician, Chief Secretary for Ireland (b. 1818)
1899 – Alvan Wentworth Chapman, American physician and botanist (b. 1809)

1901–present
1906 – Alexander Kielland, Norwegian author, playwright, and politician, 6th County Governor of Møre og Romsdal (b. 1849)
1913 – Somerset Lowry-Corry, 4th Earl Belmore (b. 1835)
1927 – Florence Earle Coates, American poet (b. 1850)
1935 – Edwin Arlington Robinson, American poet and playwright (b. 1869)
1944 – Rose O'Neill, American cartoonist, illustrator, artist, and writer (b. 1874)
1947 – Herbert Backe, German agronomist and politician (b. 1896)
1950 – Louis Wilkins, American pole vaulter (b. 1882)
1953 – Idris Davies, Welsh poet and author (b. 1905)
1959 – Leo Aryeh Mayer, Polish-Israeli scholar and academic (b. 1895)
1961 – Jules Bordet, Belgian microbiologist and immunologist, Nobel Prize laureate (b. 1870)
1963 – Otto Struve, Ukrainian-American astronomer and academic (b. 1897)
1970 – Maurice Stokes, American basketball player (b. 1933)
1971 – Igor Stravinsky, Russian-American pianist, composer, and conductor (b. 1882)
1974 – Willem Marinus Dudok, Dutch architect (b. 1884)
  1974   – Hudson Fysh, Australian pilot and businessman, co-founded Qantas Airways Limited (b. 1895)
1977 – Kōichi Kido, Japanese politician, 13th Lord Keeper of the Privy Seal of Japan (b. 1889)
1979 – Ivan Vasilyov, Bulgarian architect, designed the SS. Cyril and Methodius National Library (b. 1893)
1983 – Jayanto Nath Chaudhuri, Indian General who served as the Chief of Army Staff of the Indian Army from 1962 to 1966 and the Military Governor of Hyderabad State from 1948 to 1949. (b. 1908)
1992 – Isaac Asimov, American science fiction writer (b. 1920)
1994 – Juvénal Habyarimana, Rwandan banker and politician, 3rd President of Rwanda (b. 1937)
  1994   – Cyprien Ntaryamira, Burundian politician, 5th President of Burundi (b. 1955)
1995 – Ioannis Alevras, Greek banker and politician, President of Greece (b. 1912)
1996 – Greer Garson, English-American actress (b. 1904)
1998 – Norbert Schmitz, German footballer (b. 1958)
  1998   – Tammy Wynette, American singer-songwriter (b. 1942)
1999 – Red Norvo, American vibraphone player and composer (b. 1908)
2000 – Habib Bourguiba, Tunisian politician, 1st President of Tunisia (b. 1903)
2001 – Charles Pettigrew, American singer-songwriter (b. 1963)
2003 – David Bloom, American journalist (b. 1963)
  2003   – Anita Borg, American computer scientist and educator; founded Anita Borg Institute for Women and Technology (b. 1949)
  2003   – Gerald Emmett Carter, Canadian cardinal (b. 1912)
  2003   – Babatunde Olatunji, Nigerian drummer, educator, and activist (b. 1927)
  2003   – Dino Yannopoulos, Greek stage director of the Metropolitan Opera (b. 1919) 
2004 – Lou Berberet, American baseball player (b. 1929)
  2004   – Larisa Bogoraz, Russian linguist and activist (b. 1929)
2005 – Rainier III, Prince of Monaco (b. 1923)
2006 – Maggie Dixon, American basketball player and coach (b. 1977)
  2006   – Francis L. Kellogg, American soldier and diplomat (b. 1917)
  2006   – Stefanos Stratigos, Greek actor and director (b. 1926)
2007 – Luigi Comencini, Italian director and producer (b. 1916)
2009 – J. M. S. Careless, Canadian historian and academic (b. 1919)
  2009   – Shawn Mackay, Australian rugby player and coach (b. 1982)
2010 – Wilma Mankiller, American tribal leader (b. 1945)
  2010   – Corin Redgrave, English actor (b. 1939)
2011 – Gerald Finnerman, American director and cinematographer (b. 1931)
2012 – Roland Guilbault, American admiral (b. 1934)
  2012   – Thomas Kinkade, American painter and illustrator (b. 1958)
  2012   – Fang Lizhi, Chinese astrophysicist and academic (b. 1936)
  2012   – Sheila Scotter, Australian fashion designer and journalist (b. 1920)
  2012   – Reed Whittemore, American poet and critic (b. 1919)
2013 – Hilda Bynoe, Grenadian physician and politician, 2nd Governor of Grenada (b. 1921)
  2013   – Bill Guttridge, English footballer and manager (b. 1931)
  2013   – Bigas Luna, Spanish director and screenwriter (b. 1946)
  2013   – Ottmar Schreiner, German lawyer and politician (b. 1946)
2014 – Mary Anderson, American actress (b. 1918)
  2014   – Jacques Castérède, French pianist and composer (b. 1926)
  2014   – Liv Dommersnes, Norwegian actress (b. 1922)
  2014   – Mickey Rooney, American soldier, actor, and dancer (b. 1920)
  2014   – Chuck Stone, American soldier, journalist, and academic (b. 1924)
  2014   – Massimo Tamburini, Italian motorcycle designer, co-founded Bimota (b. 1943)
2015 – Giovanni Berlinguer, Italian lawyer and politician (b. 1924)
  2015   – James Best, American actor, director, and screenwriter (b. 1926)
  2015   – Ray Charles, American singer-songwriter and conductor (b. 1918)
  2015   – Dollard St. Laurent, Canadian ice hockey player (b. 1929)
2016 – Merle Haggard, American singer-songwriter and guitarist (b. 1937)
2017 – Don Rickles, American actor and comedian (b. 1926)
2019 – Michael O'Donnell, British physician, journalist, author and broadcaster (b. 1928) 
2020 – Al Kaline, American baseball player, broadcaster and executive (b.1934)
2021 – Hans Küng, Swiss Catholic priest, theologian, and author (b. 1928)
2022 – Vladimir Zhirinovsky, Russian and Soviet politician (b. 1946)
  2022   – Jill Knight, British politician (b. 1923)

Holidays and observances
Chakri Day, commemorating the establishment of the Chakri dynasty. (Thailand)
Christian feast day:
Albrecht Dürer and Lucas Cranach (Lutheran Church).
Brychan
Eutychius of Constantinople (Eastern Orthodox Church)
Marcellinus of Carthage
Pope Sixtus I
April 6 (Eastern Orthodox liturgics)
International Day of Sport for Development and Peace
National Fisherman Day (Indonesia)
New Beer's Eve (United States)
Tartan Day (United States & Canada)
Waltzing Matilda Day (Australia)
International Asexuality Day

Other
 April 6 Youth Movement
  (starts 6April)

References

External links

 BBC: On This Day
 
 Historical Events on April 6

Days of the year
April